Pacific Centennial Oscillation is a climate oscillation predicted by some climate models.

In the Pacific Ocean, variability in sea surface temperatures is an important influence on precipitation regimens in the Americas and how this variability changes in response to anthropogenic climate change (El Nino-like or La Nina-like) may determine the outcome of climate change. The sea surface temperature patterns may fluctuate over thousands or millions of years and determining trends and patterns from observational data is difficult.

The predicted effects have some similarities to El Nino Southern Oscillation and may be responsible for recent La Nina-like trends in Pacific Ocean temperature patterns and trends in the east–west gradient of Pacific sea surface temperatures from 1900 forward; in one climate model the Pacific Centennial Oscillation drives long droughts in the Southwestern United States such as the 2011–2017 California drought.

The Pacific Centennial Oscillation cycle however might be spurious, a model artifact. Later research has shown the possibility that centennial cycles in the Pacific Ocean sea surface temperature structure can be a consequence of an overly long Pacific cold tongue, although genuine centennial cycles in nature cannot be completely ruled out and has been re-proposed to explain centennial droughts in the Southwestern United States.

References

Sources 

 
 
 

Regional climate effects
Climate modeling